The 2016 Canberra Raiders Cup was the 19th season of the cup, and the 93rd season of domestic rugby league in Canberra. The 2016 Canberra Raiders Cup consisted of 18 regular season rounds which began on 9 April and ended on 20 August. There were 3 playoff rounds, beginning on 27 August with the first semi-final, and ending on 11 September with the Grand Final.

Teams 
9 teams will compete in 2016.

Ladder

Stats

Most Tries

Most Goals

Most Field Goals

Most Points

Season Awards

Les McIntyre Medal Player Of The Year

Robert Roberts (West Belconnen Warriors)

Coach Of The Year

Lincoln Withers & David Howell (Gungahlin Bulls)

Top Pointscorer

Brent Crisp (Queanbeyan Kangaroos)

Top Tryscorer

Tyler Stevens (Queanbeyan United Blues)

Regular-season results

Round 1

Round 2

Round 3

Round 4

Round 5

Round 6

Round 7

Round 8

Round 9

Round 10

Round 11

Round 12

Round 13

Round 14

Round 15

Round 16

Round 17

Round 18

Finals

Bracket

Semi-finals

Preliminary Finals

Grand Finals 

2016 in Australian rugby league
Rugby league in the Australian Capital Territory